Cyrtulus mauiensis is a species of sea snail, a marine gastropod mollusk in the family Fasciolariidae, the spindle snails, the tulip snails and their allies.

Description

Distribution
This marine species occurs off Hawaii.

References

 Callomon P. & Snyder M.A. (2006) On the genus Fusinus in Japan II: F. undatus, F. similis and related Pacific taxa, with the description of F. mauiensis n. sp. Venus, 65(3): 177-191
 Vermeij G.J. & Snyder M.A. (2018). Proposed genus-level classification of large species of Fusininae (Gastropoda, Fasciolariidae). Basteria. 82(4-6): 57-82

mauiensis
Gastropods described in 2006